Hesdey Suart (born 30 January 1986) is a Dutch former professional footballer who played as a left-back. He is of Surinamese origin.

Club career
Born in Capelle aan den IJssel, Suart began playing football with local club SVS Capelle aan den IJssel before being scouted by Feyenoord. After one year, he moved to the Vitesse youth academy, where he was included in the first team squad in 2005, but failed to make an appearance. In order for him to gain more playing time, he was sent on a six-month loan to Eerste Divisie club Helmond Sport on 3 January 2007. After his loan ended, the club signed him on a permanent deal. Suart moved to AGOVV in 2007.

In summer 2010, he moved to Polish club Cracovia on a three-year contract. After two years with Cracovia in the Polish Ekstraklasa he returned to the Netherlands in 2012 and signed for amateur club FC Presikhaaf. After six months, Suart was close to signing a contract with Greek club Iraklis Psachna, but the transfer fell through because of financial irregularities.

In June 2013, Suart signed with DFS. Suart finished his footballing career with AWC from Wijchen.

International career
Suart gained two caps for the Netherlands national under-19 team, making his international debut on 23 March 2005 in a friendly against Austria.

References

External links
 

Living people
1986 births
People from Capelle aan den IJssel
Dutch sportspeople of Surinamese descent
Dutch footballers
Association football defenders
Eerste Divisie players
Ekstraklasa players
SC Feyenoord players
SBV Vitesse players
Helmond Sport players
AGOVV Apeldoorn players
MKS Cracovia (football) players
Dutch expatriate footballers
Dutch expatriate sportspeople in Poland
Expatriate footballers in Poland
Netherlands youth international footballers
Footballers from South Holland
SV AWC players